The Curtiss-Wright XP-55 Ascender (company designation CW-24) is a 1940s United States prototype fighter aircraft built by Curtiss-Wright. Along with the Vultee XP-54 and Northrop XP-56, it resulted from United States Army Air Corps proposal R-40C issued on 27 November 1939 for aircraft with improved performance, armament, and pilot visibility over existing fighters; it specifically allowed for unconventional aircraft designs. An unusual design for its time, it had a canard configuration, a rear-mounted engine, swept wings, and two vertical tails. Because of its pusher design, it was sarcastically referred to as the "Ass-ender". Like the XP-54, the Ascender was designed for the Pratt & Whitney X-1800 engine, but was re-designed after that engine project was canceled. It was also the first Curtiss fighter aircraft to use tricycle landing gear.

Design and development

June 1940, the Curtiss-Wright company received an Army contract for preliminary engineering data and a powered wind tunnel model. The designation P-55 was reserved for the project. The USAAC was dissatisfied with the results of these tests. Accordingly, Curtiss-Wright built a flying full-scale model they designated CW-24B. The flying testbed was powered by a  Menasco C68-5 inline engine. It had a fabric-covered, welded steel tube fuselage with a wooden wing. The undercarriage was non-retractable.

July 1942, the United States Army Air Forces issued a contract for three prototypes under the designation XP-55. Serial numbers were 42-78845 through 42-78847. During this time, the Pratt & Whitney X-1800 H-block sleeve valve engine was delayed, and was eventually canceled. Curtiss decided to switch to the  Allison V-1710 (F16) liquid-cooled inline engine because of its proven reliability. Armament was to be two  cannon and two  machine guns. During the mock-up phase, engineers switched to the  V-1710-95. The 20 mm cannons were also replaced by 0.50 in machine guns.

One feature of the XP-55 was a propeller jettison lever inside the cockpit to prevent the pilot from hitting the propeller during bailout. The jettison device was invented by W. Jerome Peterson while working as a design engineer for Curtiss-Wright.

Operational history

The first XP-55 (42-78845) was completed on 13 July 1943 with the same configuration as the final prototype CW-24B. The aircraft made its first flight on 19 July 1943 from the Army's Scott Field near the Curtiss-Wright plant in St Louis, Missouri. The pilot was J. Harvey Gray, Curtiss' test pilot. Testing revealed the takeoff run was excessively long. To solve this problem, the nose elevator size was increased and the aileron up-trim was interconnected with the flaps so it operated after the flaps were lowered.

November 1943, test pilot Harvey Gray, flying the first XP-55 (S/N 42-78845), was testing the aircraft's stall performance at altitude. Suddenly, the XP-55 inverted into an uncontrolled descent. The pilot was unable to right the airplane, and it fell out of control for  before Gray was able to parachute to safety. The aircraft was destroyed.

The second XP-55 (S/N 42-78846) was similar to the first, but with a slightly larger nose-elevator, modified elevator-tab systems, and a change from balance tabs to spring tabs on the ailerons. It flew for the first time on 9 January 1944. All flight tests were restricted so the stall-zone was avoided.

The third XP-55 (S/N 42-78847) flew for the first time on 25 April 1944. It was fitted with four machine guns, and incorporated some of the lessons from the loss of the first XP-55. Engineers discovered the aircraft's stall characteristics could be improved by the addition of four-foot wingtip extensions, and by increasing the limits of the nose elevator travel. Between 16 September and 2 October 1944, the second XP-55 (42-78846), modified to the standards as the third aircraft, underwent official USAAF flight trials.

The performance of the XP-55 was inferior to conventional fighter aircraft. Sealing its fate, by 1944, jet-powered fighters were in development; that terminated development of the XP-55.

The third prototype XP-55 (s/n 42-78847) was lost on 27 May 1945 during the closing day of the Seventh War Bond Air Show at the Army Air Forces Fair at Wright Field in Dayton, Ohio. After a low pass in formation with a Lockheed P-38 Lightning and a North American P-51 Mustang on each wing, its pilot, William C. Glasgow, attempted a slow roll, but lost altitude and crashed, sending flaming debris into occupied civilian ground vehicles on a highway near the airfield. The crash killed Glasgow and four civilians on the ground.

Aircraft disposition

 42-78845: crashed during vertical dive on Nov 15, 1943. Pilot bailed out.
 42-78846: on display at the Air Zoo in Kalamazoo, Michigan. It is on long-term loan from the Smithsonian's National Air and Space Museum in Washington, D.C.
 42-78847: crashed during air show at Wright Field, Ohio on May 27, 1945. Pilot killed.

Specifications (XP-55)

See also

References

Citations

Bibliography

McIntyre, Violet. Niagara Gazette, Niagara Falls, NY, 11 November 2004.

Further reading

External links

NMUSAF – Curtiss XP-55
NASM article
XP-55 Ascender by Joe Baugher
Curtiss Wright XP-55 Ascender -USAAF Resource Center at warbirdsresourcegroup.org
Dayton Air Show History
"Flying Backwards to the Future", Popular Science, August 1945

P-55 Ascender
Curtiss P-55 Ascender
Single-engined pusher aircraft
Canard aircraft
Cancelled military aircraft projects of the United States
Aircraft first flown in 1943